Evsei Markovich Rabinovich (Russian: Евесӣ Мaрkoвч Рабинoвч, 6 July 1930—2020) , was a Russian physicist of Ukrainian origin who participated in the former Soviet program of nuclear weapons, and was one designer of the two-stage RDS-37 thermonuclear discharges and its successor, the RDS-220, the largest-ever bomb.

He studied engineering physics at the Moscow Engineering Physics Institute, and was honored with the Doctor of Scicnces degree before joining the Soviet program of nuclear weapons in 1954. 

Rabinovich worked at KB-11 (English: Design Bureau-11), now known as the All-Russian Scientific Research Institute of Experimental Physics, where a significant group of physicists, mathematicians and chemists worked in secret; his work was under the direction of Yakov Zel'dovich, a principal phsycist (and well-known cosmologist) who was directing research groups at KB-11 and the Institute of Chemical Physics.

During the development of the RDS-220, Rabinovich became concerned that the device would not work and shared his worries with colleagues before raising them with his superiors. His concerns were taken so seriously that after discussion with the project design leads Viktor Adamsky and Vyacheslav Feodoritov, and chief weapons designer Andrei Sakharov, all of whom provided counter-arguments, Sakharov - one of the chief designers - altered the design of the bomb to reduce the margins of error in calculating the processes which had vexed Rabinovich.

He authored papers on electron-positron pair production and (with Zel'dovich) statistical formulae in a Fermi gas. Later, he became a deputy director of the Wave Research Centre in Moscow, an offshoot of the Lebedev Physical Institute of the Russian Academy of Sciences.

References

1930s births
2020 deaths
People from Kyiv
Moscow Engineering Physics Institute alumni
Soviet physicists
Russian people of Ukrainian descent
Lenin Prize winners
Recipients of the Order of the Red Banner of Labour
Russian physicists
Nuclear weapons program of the Soviet Union